Bruno João Nandingna Borges Fernandes (born 6 November 1978), known as Bruno Fernandes, is a Guinea-Bissauan retired professional footballer who played as a central defender.

Honours
Unirea Urziceni
Liga I: 2008–09

References

External links

1978 births
Living people
Portuguese sportspeople of Bissau-Guinean descent
Citizens of Guinea-Bissau through descent
Bissau-Guinean footballers
Association football defenders
Primeira Liga players
Liga Portugal 2 players
Segunda Divisão players
Amora F.C. players
C.F. Os Belenenses players
C.D. Aves players
First Professional Football League (Bulgaria) players
PFC Beroe Stara Zagora players
Liga I players
CSM Ceahlăul Piatra Neamț players
FC Unirea Urziceni players
ASA 2013 Târgu Mureș players
Cypriot First Division players
Alki Larnaca FC players
National League (English football) players
Droylsden F.C. players
Workington A.F.C. players
Cymru Premier players
Cefn Druids A.F.C. players
Guinea-Bissau international footballers
Bissau-Guinean expatriate footballers
Expatriate footballers in Bulgaria
Expatriate footballers in Romania
Expatriate footballers in Cyprus
Expatriate footballers in England
Expatriate footballers in Wales
Bissau-Guinean expatriate sportspeople in Bulgaria
Bissau-Guinean expatriate sportspeople in Romania
Bissau-Guinean expatriate sportspeople in Cyprus
Bissau-Guinean expatriate sportspeople in England
Bissau-Guinean expatriate sportspeople in Wales
Portuguese expatriate sportspeople in Bulgaria
Portuguese expatriate sportspeople in Romania
Portuguese expatriate sportspeople in Cyprus
Portuguese expatriate sportspeople in England
Portuguese expatriate sportspeople in Wales